James Edward Boyd (March 31, 1918 – October 14, 1965) was an American baseball pitcher in the Negro leagues. He played with the Newark Eagles in 1946.

References

External links
 and Seamheads

Newark Eagles players
1918 births
1965 deaths
Baseball players from South Carolina
Baseball pitchers
People from Winnsboro, South Carolina
20th-century African-American sportspeople